Nguyễn Văn Vĩnh (1882–1936) was a Vietnamese journalist and translator of Western literature in the early 20th-century during the Nguyễn dynasty. Together with François-Henri Schneider he founded the Đông Dương tạp chí (1912) as the first successful Vietnamese Quốc ngữ newspaper in Hanoi. The paper was technically owned by Schneider, since only a Frenchman could obtain a license to publish a newspaper. Its French sister paper was France-Indochine.

Nguyễn Văn Vĩnh was a 'non-communist' nationalist moderniser who sought to renew the Vietnamese culture by adopting Western ways of life. He rejected the political violence of the Restoration League, arguing in 1913 that the Vietnamese should 'use the cultural benefits of France to shut out seditious noises, so that the explosions caused by the rebels will not drown out the drums of civilization'. Vĩnh used the Indochina Review to criticize Vietnamese culture in a series of articles entitled 'Examining Our Defects'.  

In the 1930s, he worked together with the French and translated numerous Western literary works such as La Fontaine's Fables and Jonathan Swift’s Gulliver’s Travels into Quốc ngữ in an attempt to introduce the Vietnamese to Western culture.

Nguyễn Văn Vĩnh was also credited with devising the original set of rules for the Telex Vietnamese character encoding system.

References 

1882 births
1936 deaths
Vietnamese journalists
Vietnamese translators
Translators to Vietnamese
20th-century translators
20th-century journalists